
Gmina Trąbki Wielkie is a rural borough (administrative district) in Gdańsk County, Pomeranian Voivodeship, in northern Poland.

In 2006 its total population was 9,495, at the end of 2010 – 10.221, in year 2011 – 10.484 and in year 2015 - 10.688.

Villages
Gmina Trąbki Wielkie contains the villages and settlements of Błotnia, Celmerostwo, Cząstkowo, Czerniec, Czerniewko, Czerniewo, Domachowo, Drzewina, Ełganówko, Ełganowo, Glinna Góra, Gołębiewko, Gołębiewo, Gołębiewo Średnie, Graniczna Wieś, Kaczki, Klępiny, Kleszczewo, Kłodawa, Klowiter, Kobierzyn, Łaguszewo, Mierzeszyn, Pawłowo, Postołowo, Pruska Karczma, Rościszewko, Rościszewo, Sobowidz, Trąbki Małe, Trąbki Wielkie, Warcz, Wojanowo, Wymysłowo, Zaskoczyn, Zielenina and Zła Wieś.

Neighbouring gminas
Gmina Trąbki Wielkie is bordered by the boroughs of Kolbudy, Pruszcz Gdański, Przywidz, Pszczółki, Skarszewy and Tczew.

References
Polish official population figures 2006

Trabki Wielkie
Gdańsk County